Chanelle Jade Hayes (née Sinclair, born 11 November 1987) is an English television personality, model, singer and businesswoman. She was a student at NEW College, Pontefract, West Yorkshire, studying Spanish, music and English before becoming well known by appearing on the Channel 4 reality series Big Brother in 2007, when she was 19. She currently runs a cake making business in Wakefield, along with performing occasional media work.

Early life
Hayes was born Chanelle Jade Sinclair in 1987 in Wythenshawe, a suburb of Manchester, England. Her mother, Andrea Sinclair, a 32-year-old prostitute, was murdered by client Keith Pollard on 5 April 1988, when Hayes was not quite five months old. Hayes was then put up for adoption and was brought up in Wakefield, West Yorkshire by Christine and Harry Hayes. At age 15 she sought information about her birth family from social workers and was reunited with her grandmother and her sisters in Sheffield.

Career
In 2007, Hayes emerged into the public eye when she appeared on the eighth series of the UK's Big Brother. Following her appearance in Big Brother, she appeared many times in newspapers and magazines doing photo shoots and interviews. On 23 November 2007, it was revealed that Hayes was voted the Favourite Big Brother Housemate Ever by the forum members of Digital Spy. She was also voted the second Sexiest Female Housemate Ever, losing by a narrow margin to Imogen Thomas.

In April 2008, Hayes was cast in a video by the creative advertising team of Lee & Dan Special Projects, who had been hired by MTV UK to produce a viral advertisement for the new MTV comedy Fur TV.

In May 2008, BBC Radio 1 declined to add her debut single to the playlist, despite interviewing her on the Chris Moyles breakfast show. In May 2008, she also topped a poll by Domino's Pizza, to find Britain's least talented celebrity. In June, she stated her "fame may be over" as TV producers started putting her television ideas on hold. In August the organisers of V festival reportedly declined her request to sing.

In June 2008, Hayes started a column in glossy weekly magazine Star. She shared her views on Big Brother 9 for thirteen weeks until the show finished on 5 September 2008.

In 2011, Hayes opened a cake making business in Wakefield.

Her autobiography – Baring My Heart, co-written with Anna Pointer, and published by John Blake Publishing, was released on 3 July 2014.

Television work

Big Brother 2007
Hayes was one of the housemates of Big Brother 8 in 2007. She started a relationship with fellow housemate Ziggy Lichman in the house, though they split up and got back together several times during the series. Hayes was tested by Big Brother and had one of the highest IQs in the house, scoring 114. On Day 61 (Sunday 29 July 2007) Hayes left and re-entered the house after consulting a psychologist. Hayes left the house at her own request on Day 62. She re-entered the House for a few minutes on Day 89 as part of a task.

Wannabe
Hayes was asked to become a member of the judging panel in a VH1 UK show, Wannabe, in which Hayes and a panel of judges had to put together a band of 25+ year old girls for a live concert.

Nuts TV
Hayes co-presented live on Nuts TV with O.J. Borg and was asked to present a show on a regular Wednesday slot, but she had to stop presenting on the channel to make time for her music career.

Chanelle: Wannabe Popstar
Hayes also starred in a reality TV series for VH1 UK called Chanelle: Wannabe Popstar. Launched on 18 April 2008, it charted her progress as she attempted to make a debut single and music video.

Other

Hayes has also appeared on This Morning, Celebrity Scissorhands and Ready Steady Cook.

On 5 June 2008, Hayes appeared on the BB Launch Night Special of The Friday Night Project (1 episode, The Big Brother Launch Project, 2008). Among other things she co-hosted a quiz section with Brian Dowling. Three days later she appeared in "Fame," the second episode of How TV Changed Britain (Channel Four). This episode described how television has transformed our understanding of fame in the UK.

On 27 July 2008, Hayes appeared as a celebrity guest on the first episode of Totally Calum Best: The Best Is Yet to Come (MTV UK). On 23 September that year, she appeared as a guest on Losing It-Griff Rhys Jones on Anger, a BBC2 documentary by Griff Rhys Jones, where she discussed anger.

On 11 January 2009, she appeared as a contributor on the BBC1 programme The Big Questions, presented by Nicky Campbell. The topic she was asked to talk about was, "Is it wrong to kiss and tell". On 18 March 2009, Hayes appeared as a guest panellist on the ITV2 show Celebrity Juice. She replaced Holly Willoughby who left the panel in the commercial break, as she was tired due to her pregnancy. Before joining the panel alongside Dave Berry and David Van Day, Hayes was the guest on the cover story section of the show. She returned as a guest on the cover story section in March 2011. On 28 May 2009, Hayes appeared on the E4 show Big Brother's Big Quiz as a member of the audience, along with many other ex-housemates and a few selected members of the public. The show featured humorous observations about Hayes' relationship with Lichman in the Big Brother 8 house; the September image from Hayes' 2009 calendar; and the name of her perfume ("Mwah!").

Modelling
Hayes has modelled numerous times for Diva Corsets and regularly appears in the media promoting the Michelle for George lingerie line.

In May 2008, Hayes said that she wanted to make one of the biggest-selling calendars of 2009. She revealed that she was aiming to beat glamour models Lucy Pinder, Gemma Atkinson and Keeley Hazell to the title, saying "All the girls are gorgeous and it’s brilliant to even be up there competing with girls who have been in the business a lot longer than me. But me, a relative nobody, came fourth this year (2008), which is pretty damn good! Now I want to do even better and maybe knock one out of the way!".

It was reported on 22 March 2009 that Hayes would promote the new MadWorld game for Nintendo Wii.

Glamour modelling
Since she left the Big Brother house, Hayes began to regularly appear on the cover of Lads' magazines such as Nuts and Zoo Weekly.

Personal life
Chanelle has a son with Matthew Bates and another son with Ryan Oates.

Music
Having signed with Eminence Records, 7th Heaven (Ministry of Sound) released a mix of Hayes' new song "I Want It" for the dance clubs. Hayes' original version of the song and its music video premiered on MTV, and the CD and online download of the song (including three different mix versions, and a 7th Heaven radio mix music video) were officially released on 12 May 2008. The song entered the official UK Singles Chart at No. 63. The 7th Heaven and Club Junkies Remixes of the song reached top 10 in combined DJ club charts, its highest position was No.2 in the UK Pop Club Charts (30/04/08) and No.9 in the Upfront Club Charts. Hayes later spoke of the possibility of recording a debut album.

Hayes' American record label is Next Plateau Entertainment, which is affiliated with Universal Republic Records. Her single, "I Want It," has been widely distributed on three promotional CDs by Promo Only, the music source for professional disc jockeys, radio stations, music industry professionals and entertainment venues. The three CDs are Promo Only UK Club Beats: April 2008 (7th Heaven Mix of "I Want It"), Promo Only Dance Radio: October 2008 (7th Heaven Radio Mix of "I Want It"), and Promo Only Rhythm Club: January 2009 (Club Junkies Club Mix of "I Want It").

The 7th Heaven remix of "I Want It" was also added to Dance Dance Revolution Encore arcade machines.

Discography

Singles

Products
In late 2007, Hayes designed and launched her own perfume called "Mwah...". She has also released calendars for 2008, 2009, 2010 and 2014. Her autobiography, Baring My Heart, was released in July 2014 in hardcover and e-Book form.

References

External links

1987 births
Living people
Glamour models
Big Brother (British TV series) contestants
English female models
People from Wakefield
English adoptees
21st-century English women singers
21st-century English singers